The Supercoppa Italiana is the national ice hockey supercup in Italy. It was first played in 2001, and is contested by the previous season's Serie A and Coppa Italia champions.

Champions

Titles by team
 Asiago Hockey (6): 2003, 2013, 2015, 2020, 2021, 2022
 Ritten Sport (5): 2009, 2010, 2017, 2018, 2019
 HC Bolzano (4): 2004, 2007, 2008, 2012
 HC Milano Vipers (3): 2001, 2002, 2006
 Val Pusteria (2): 2014, 2016
 HC Pustertal (1): 2011

External links
 Italian Ice Hockey Federation

Ice hockey competitions in Italy